Jann is a Canadian television comedy series that premiered on CTV on March 20, 2019.  It stars Canadian singer-songwriter Jann Arden as a fictionalized version of herself and is loosely based on events from her life. The cast also includes Zoie Palmer, Patrick Gilmore, Deborah Grover, Elena Juatco, Alexa Rose Steele, and Jason Blicker.

Plot
Jann is a former pop star struggling to cope with turmoil in her personal life, including the breakup of her relationship with Cynthia, her longtime girlfriend, her mother's diagnosis of early-stage dementia, and trying to rebuild her career in the hope of finally outshining her archrival Sarah McLachlan.

Cast and characters
 Jann Arden as her fictional self
 Zoie Palmer as Max, Jann's younger sister
 Deborah Grover as Nora, Jann's mother
 Patrick Gilmore as Dave, Max's husband and Jann's brother in law
 Elena Juatco as Cale, Jann's new manager
 Jason Blicker as Todd, Jann's long-term manager
 Sharon Taylor as Cynthia, Jann's ex-partner
 Alexa Rose Steele as Charley, Jann's eldest niece

Episodes

Season 1 (2019)

Season 2 (2020)

Season 3 (2021)

Production

Production on six half-hour episodes for Season 1 began in Calgary on September 11, 2018. Production on Season 2, consisting of eight episodes, began on October 1, 2019, and wrapped in early November 2019. Production on Season 3, consisting of eight episodes, began on February 25, 2021.

Sarah McLachlan appears as herself in a guest role in the second season. Arden has clarified in interviews that she and McLachlan get along well in real life, and their fictionalized rivalry in the television series draws as much from McLachlan's own ideas as Arden's.

Other guests in the second season include Keshia Chanté as Nia Taylor, an up-and-coming new singer signed by Todd after he drops Jann as a client; Elisha Cuthbert as Liz, a school board trustee; and Miguel Rivas as Nigel, a megafan of Jann's.

Guests in the third season include Michael Bublé as himself.

Release
Jann premiered on March 20, 2019, with its first season becoming the "most-watched" Canadian television series and comedy of the year.

In October 2020, Hulu acquired American distribution rights to the series.
In January 2023, the series has left Hulu and is now on The Roku Channel in the US, with them acquiring the first two seasons of the series and releasing the third one at its launch on the platform on January 17, 2023.

Accolades 
The series has been nominated for awards such as the Canadian Screen Awards, Canadian Society of Cinematographers, Leo Awards and Writers Guild of Canada.

References

External links
 
 

2019 Canadian television series debuts
2010s Canadian sitcoms
2010s Canadian LGBT-related comedy television series
2020s Canadian LGBT-related comedy television series
2010s Canadian music television series
2020s Canadian music television series
Bisexuality-related television series
Lesbian-related television shows
Television shows filmed in Calgary
CTV Television Network original programming
2020s Canadian sitcoms
Canadian LGBT-related sitcoms
Television series about families
Television series based on singers and musicians
Television series by Bell Media
English-language television shows